Asciminib, sold under the brand name Scemblix, is a medication used to treat Philadelphia chromosome-positive chronic myeloid leukemia (Ph+ CML). Asciminib is a protein kinase inhibitor.

The most common adverse reactions include upper respiratory tract infections, musculoskeletal pain, fatigue, nausea, rash, and diarrhea.

Asciminib was approved for medical use in the United States in October 2021, and in the European Union in August 2022.

Mechanism of action 
Asciminib is described as a "STAMP inhibitor," which means "specifically targeting the ABL myristoyl pocket." The wild-type ABL has a myristoylated N-terminus, which binds to an allosteric site, but the ABL fusion protein does not have the myristoylated domain. In the wild-type protein, when myristoylated N-terminus binds to the allosteric site, the kinase has reduced activity. Since the mutant fusion protein does not have the myristoylated N-terminus domain, it is not subject to this form of regulation, and thus the fusion protein is constitutively active. Asciminib binds to the allosteric site, resulting in an inhibition of bcr-abl activity.

Unlike other bcr-abl inhibitors, such as imatinib, asciminib does not bind to the ATP-binding site on the active site of the enzyme. Asciminib and active site bcr-abl inhibitors have non-overlapping resistance mutations. The mutations A337V and P223S overcome the inhibitory activity of asciminib, but asciminib is not affected by the notorious T315I mutation that affects most ATP-competitive active site inhibitors, except ponatinib.

Adverse effects 
Common side effects of Asciminib are symptoms of a cold, muscle pain, joint pain, bone pain, fatigue, nausea, diarrhea, rash as well as the patient displaying abnormal blood tests. Serious side effects of the medication include high blood pressure, low blood cell count, problems with the pancreas, and heart issues. Side effects of the medication on the pancreas may be observed via changes in serum lipase and amylase levels.

Pharmacodynamics 
Asciminib is a substrate of the CYP3A4 enzyme. Asciminib is an inhibitor of CYP3A4, CYP2C9, and P-glycoprotein. Asciminib reaches steady state in 3 days. The volume of distribution of Asciminib is 151 L.

Society and culture

Legal status 
On 23 June 2022, the Committee for Medicinal Products for Human Use (CHMP) of the European Medicines Agency (EMA) adopted a positive opinion, recommending the granting of a marketing authorization for the medicinal product Scemblix, intended for the treatment of adults with Philadelphia chromosome‑positive chronic myeloid leukemia in chronic phase who have previously been treated with two or more tyrosine kinase inhibitors. The applicant for this medicinal product is Novartis Europharm Limited. Asciminib was approved for medical use in the European Union in August 2022.

The US Food and Drug Administration (FDA) granted the application for asciminib priority review, fast track, orphan drug, and breakthrough therapy designations.

References

External links 
 
 
 

Breakthrough therapy
Non-receptor tyrosine kinase inhibitors
Novartis brands
Orphan drugs
Pyrrolidines
Pyridines
Pyrazoles
Carboxamides
Difluoromethoxy compounds
Organochlorides